National Institute of Immunology may refer to:

National Institute of Immunology (Instituto Nacional de Inmunología), in Hospital San Juan de Dios, Bogotá, Colombia
National Institute of Immunology, India

See also 
NII (disambiguation)